Cupertino is a city in Santa Clara County, California, United States, directly west of San Jose on the western edge of the Santa Clara Valley with portions extending into the foothills of the Santa Cruz Mountains. The population was 60,381 as of the 2020 census. It is known for being the home of Apple Inc., headquartered at Apple Park.

Etymology
Cupertino was named after Arroyo San José de Cupertino (now Stevens Creek). The creek had been named by Spanish explorer Juan Bautista de Anza's cartographer, who named it after Saint Joseph of Cupertino. Saint Joseph was born Giuseppe Maria Desa, and was later named after the town of Copertino, where he was born, in the Apulia region of Italy. The name Cupertino first became widely used when John T. Doyle, a San Francisco lawyer, and historian, named his winery on McClellan Road Cupertino. After the turn of the 20th century, Cupertino displaced the former name for the region, which was West Side.

History

In the 19th century, Cupertino was a small rural village at the crossroads of Stevens Creek Road and Saratoga-Mountain View Road (also known locally as Highway 9; later Saratoga-Sunnyvale Road, and then renamed to De Anza Boulevard within Cupertino city limits).  For decades, the intersection was dominated on the southeast corner by the R. Cali Brothers Feed Mill, replaced today with the Cali Mill Plaza and City Hall.  Back then, it was known as the West Side and was part of Fremont Township. The primary economic activity was fruit agriculture. Almost all of the land within Cupertino's present-day boundaries was covered by prune, plum, apricot, and cherry orchards. A winery on Montebello Ridge overlooking the Cupertino valley region was also in operation by the late 19th century.

Soon railroads, electric railways, and dirt roads traversed the West Side farmlands. Monta Vista, Cupertino's first housing tract, was developed in the mid-20th century as a result of the electric railway's construction.

After World War II, a population and suburban housing boom dramatically shifted the demographics and economy of the Santa Clara Valley, as the "Valley of Heart's Delight" was beginning to transform into "Silicon Valley". In 1954, a rancher, Norman Nathanson, the Cupertino-Monta Vista Improvement Association, and the Fact Finding Committee, began a drive for incorporation. On September 27, 1955, voters approved the incorporation of the city of Cupertino (225 voted "yes" and 183 voted "no"). Cupertino officially became Santa Clara County's 13th city on October 10, 1955.

A major milestone in Cupertino's development was the creation by some of the city's largest landowners of VALLCO Business and Industrial Park in the early 1960s. Of the 25 property owners, 17 decided to pool their land to form VALLCO Park, 6 sold to Varian Associates (property later sold to Hewlett-Packard), and two opted for transplanting to farms elsewhere. The name VALLCO was derived from the names of the principal developers: Varian Associates and the Leonard, Lester, Craft, and Orlando families. A neighborhood outdoor shopping center and, much later, the enclosed Vallco Fashion Park, briefly renamed Cupertino Square, were also developed.

De Anza College opened in 1967. The college, named for Juan Bautista De Anza, occupies a  site that was the location of a winery built at the turn of the 20th century, called Beaulieu by its owners, Charles and Ella Baldwin. Their mansion has now become the California History Center. De Anza College now has about 22,000 students.

Housing developments were rapidly constructed in the following years as developers created neighborhoods, including Fairgrove, Garden Gate, Monta Vista, Seven Springs, and other developments. The city is known for its high real estate prices.

Geography

Cupertino is located at  (37.3229978, −122.0321823), at the southern end of the San Francisco Bay. The eastern part of the city, located in the Santa Clara Valley, is flat, while the western part of the city slopes into the Santa Cruz Mountains. Cupertino borders San Jose and Santa Clara to the east, Saratoga to the south, Sunnyvale and Los Altos to the north, and Loyola to the northwest.

Several streams run through Cupertino on their way to south San Francisco Bay, including (from north to south): Permanente Creek, Stevens Creek, San Tomas Aquino Creek and its Smith Creek, the Regnart Creek and Prospect Creek tributaries of Calabazas Creek, and Saratoga Creek.

Climate
Cupertino has a warm-summer Mediterranean climate (Csb under the Köppen climate classification system), with warm to hot, dry summers and cool, wet winters.

Neighborhoods
Cupertino is made up of numerous subdivisions, most of them developed since the 1960s. Most of Cupertino's contemporary properties were developed around 1960. The area between Stevens Creek Boulevard, Miller Avenue, Bollinger Road, and Lawrence Expressway contains 224 Eichler homes, built during the 1950s. Two of the newest parts of Cupertino are among its oldest housing tracts. Monta Vista and Rancho Rinconada were developed outside of the city's boundaries in the 1950s and before. Rancho Rinconada was annexed in 1999 and the last part of Monta Vista was annexed in 2004. The neighborhood of Seven Springs is at the southwestern tip of Cupertino and was developed in the late 1980s. The newest and most northwestern neighborhood, Oak Valley, borders Rancho San Antonio Park and was developed around the turn of the millennium.

Cupertino is known for its high housing prices as the majority of residential properties are multimillion-dollar homes as of the priciest housing market peak of 2022, with the entry-point into a single-family home at around 2 million dollars in the Cupertino HS area, and the entry point at around 2.6 million dollars in the Monta Vista HS area. Many smaller homes start from the high $2 millions, mid-size homes start from the mid $3 millions, and larger executive homes start from mid $4 millions and can go up to as much as $7 million, as of the 2022 peak. However, townhouses and condos with similar square footage are relatively less expensive, owing mainly to negligible lot sizes and the many common walls and areas. Over the course of thirteen and a half years since the last late 2008 housing market crash, overall real estate prices have more than tripled.

Demographics

63 percent of Cupertino's population was of Asian ancestry in 2010, compared to 32 percent in Santa Clara County overall. Moneys Best Places to Live, "America's best small towns", ranked Cupertino as #27 in 2012, the second highest in California. In 2014, Movoto Real Estate ranked Cupertino the seventh "happiest" suburb in the United States, ranking highly in the categories of income, safety, marriage, and education.

In 2015, Forbes ranked Cupertino as one of the most educated places in the U.S. in respect to the percentage of high school and college graduates.

2010 For Cupertino

The 2010 United States Census reported that Cupertino had a population of 58,302. The racial makeup of Cupertino was 18,270 (31.3%) White, 344 (0.6%) Black American, 117 (0.2%) Native American, 36,895 (63.3%) Asian (28.1% Chinese, 22.6% Indian, 4.6% Korean, 3.3% Japanese, 1.3% Vietnamese), 54 (0.1%) Pacific Islander, 670 (1.1%) from other races, and 1,952 (3.3%) from two or more races. Hispanic of any race were 2,113 persons (3.6%); 2.4% of Cupertino's population is of Mexican ancestry.

The census reported that 57,965 people (99.4% of the population) lived in households, 61 (0.1%) lived in non-institutionalized group quarters, and 276 (0.5%) were institutionalized.

There were 20,181 households, out of which 9,539 (47.3%) had children under the age of 18 living in them, 13,802 (68.4%) were opposite-sex married couples living together, 1,393 (6.9%) had a female householder with no husband present, 581 (2.9%) had a male householder with no wife present. There were 378 (1.9%) unmarried opposite-sex partnerships, and 89 (0.4%) same-sex married couples or partnerships. 3,544 households (17.6%) were made up of individuals, and 1,612 (8.0%) had someone living alone who was 65 years of age or older. The average household size was 2.87. There were 15,776 families (78.2% of all households); the average family size was 3.28.

The population was spread out, with 16,075 people (27.6%) under the age of 18, 3,281 people (5.6%) aged 18 to 24, 15,621 people (26.8%) aged 25 to 44, 16,044 people (27.5%) aged 45 to 64, and 7,281 people (12.5%) who were 65 years of age or older. The median age was 39.9 years. For every 100 females, there were 97.4 males. For every 100 females age 18 and over, there were 94.6 males.

The homeowner vacancy rate was 0.8%; the rental vacancy rate was 4.7%. 36,464 people (62.5% of the population) lived in owner-occupied dwelling units and 21,501 people (36.9%) lived in rental dwelling units.

Economy

Cupertino is one of many cities that claim to be the "heart" of Silicon Valley, as many semiconductor and computer companies were founded there and in the surrounding areas. The new worldwide headquarters for Apple Inc. is located there in a modern circular complex. It is a  campus between Interstate 280, N Wolfe Rd, E Homestead Rd and along Tantau Ave one mile east of the old campus. The nine properties south of Pruneridge Avenue were bought in 2006, the property ( north of it in 2010 (from Hewlett-Packard).

On June 7, 2011, Steve Jobs gave a presentation to Cupertino City Council, detailing the architectural design of the new building and its environs. The campus houses 13,000 employees in one central four-story circular building surrounded by extensive landscaping, with parking mainly underground and the rest centralized in a parking structure.

In 2002, Cupertino had a labor force of 25,780 with an unemployment rate of 4.5%. The unemployment rate for Santa Clara County as a whole was 8.4%.

One of the major employers in the area is the aggregate rock quarry and cement plant in the foothills to the west of Cupertino, the Permanente Quarry. Owned and operated by Lehigh Southwest Cement, it was founded by Henry J. Kaiser as the Kaiser Permanente Cement Plant in 1939. It provided the majority of the cement used in the construction of the Shasta Dam. The cement plant is the sole reason for the railroad line that runs through the city.

Top employers
According to the city's 2013 Comprehensive Annual Financial Report, the top employers in the city are:

Government

Cupertino was incorporated in 1955. The highest body in the city government – the City Council – is made up of five members who serve overlapping, four-year terms. The council elects the mayor and vice-mayor for a term of one year. The city does not have its own charter. Instead, it is a General Law city, which follows provisions and requirements for cities established by the state of California.

Cupertino contracts with the Santa Clara County Sheriff's Office and the Santa Clara County Fire Department for public safety services. The Cupertino Library is part of the Santa Clara County Library System.

Education

Santa Clara County Library operates the Cupertino Library, which is located adjacent to city hall. The library, which was redesigned and rebuilt in 2004, is the busiest branch in the Santa Clara County Library system, with about 3 million items circulated annually.

The San Francisco Japanese School, a weekend educational program for Japanese citizen children living abroad, holds classes at J.F. Kennedy Middle School in Cupertino, as well as Harker, a private school.

Primary and secondary

Cupertino is known for its high-achieving primary and secondary school students. For example, Murdock-Portal Elementary and Faria Elementary School are tied for highest score for elementary public school in the state of California, per California 2013 API test scores. As of 2013, John F. Kennedy Middle School is the best public middle school in the state, and Lawson Middle School is the third best in the state. Furthermore, Monta Vista High School is ranked number 23 out of all the public high schools in the nation.

Primary (K-8) public schools are organized into the Cupertino Union School District, while the Fremont Union High School District is responsible for high school students (except for a tiny portion of the northeast corner of the city which belongs to the Santa Clara Unified School District). Cupertino High School and its feeder school, Hyde Middle School, are located in the Rancho Rinconada section of Cupertino, while Monta Vista High School and its feeder, Kennedy Middle School, are in the Monta Vista neighborhood in the western half of Cupertino. Lawson Middle School feeds mostly Cupertino and Monta Vista High. In addition, Homestead High School is located in the northwestern portion of Cupertino, along the city border with neighboring Sunnyvale.

Colleges and universities
Cupertino is home to De Anza College, one of the two community colleges in the Foothill–De Anza Community College District. The University of San Francisco has satellite campuses in Cupertino.

Transportation

The city is served by an interconnected road system. Two freeways, State Route 85 and Interstate 280, intersect in Cupertino, with multi-lane boulevards with landscaped medians and traffic lights at all major intersections. Streets nearly all have sidewalks, the few exceptions are in unincorporated pockets at the city's edges, which are maintained directly by Santa Clara County.

Cupertino has bike lanes on many of its boulevards, and has an extension of the Stevens Creek Trail through McClellan Ranch Park and Blackberry Farm. Bicycle traffic is heavy usually around morning and noon times around DeAnza College. The VTA has buses running through Cupertino at major arteries. Cupertino's main streets are well lit, while a few older roads towards the Monta Vista High School area are a little dim.

Dedicated on April 30, 2009, Cupertino opened the Mary Avenue Bicycle Footbridge, the first cable-stay bicycle-pedestrian bridge over a California freeway. This bridge connects the north and the south sections of the Stevens Creek Trail. The cost of the bridge project was $14,800,000.

The Union Pacific Railroad operates a branch line track up to the Lehigh Permanente Cement Plant from the mainline at San Jose Diridon Station. It is however strictly for the quarry and very little to no non-quarry traffic runs there.

There is no commuter rail or light rail service in the city. Caltrain commuter rail runs through the cities to the north and east, and the Santa Clara Valley Transportation Authority (VTA)'s Mountain View – Winchester light rail line runs to Campbell, California to the south. Bus service is also provided by VTA, and the prospect of a twenty-four-hour bus service on Stevens Creek Boulevard is being studied. Cupertino is also served by VTA's 523 Rapid bus, which runs from northern Sunnyvale and the Caltrain station to Downtown San Jose with limited stops and signal priority.

Cupertino is landlocked and, like most Bay Area cities, relies on the Port of Oakland for most oceangoing freight.

Passenger and cargo air transportation is available at San Jose International Airport in San Jose. The closest general aviation airport is in Palo Alto; it is known as Palo Alto Airport of Santa Clara County.

The City of Cupertino partnered with Via Transportation in October 2019 to launch a new on-demand public transportation network. Unlike traditional bus networks that rely on routes and schedules, the new microtransit service called Via allows riders to hail a shared ride on-demand through a smartphone app. The transit network serves the entire City of Cupertino with a satellite zone surrounding the Sunnyvale CalTrain station for commuters.

Notable people

Sister cities
Cupertino is twinned with:
 Copertino, Italy
 Bhubaneswar, India
 Hsinchu, Taiwan
 Toyokawa, Japan

Friendship cities
Cupertino also has friendly relations with:

 Jiangmen, China
 Jilin City, China
 Luoyang, China
 Shenzhen, China
 Taichung, Taiwan
 Taipei, Taiwan
 Tongxiang, China
 Xianning, China
 Yilan City, Taiwan
 Zhaoqing, China
 New Taipei, Taiwan

References

External links

Cupertino Courier
Cupertino Historical Society + Museum

 
1955 establishments in California
Cities in Santa Clara County, California
Cities in the San Francisco Bay Area
Incorporated cities and towns in California
Populated places established in 1955
Silicon Valley